Internal-loops (also termed interior loops) in RNA are found where the double stranded RNA separates due to no Watson-Crick-Franklin base pairing between the nucleotides. Internal-loops differ from Stem-loops as they occur in middle of a stretch of double stranded RNA. The non-canonicoal residues result in the double helix becoming distorted due to unwinding, unstacking and kinking.

Internal-loops can be classified as either symmetrical or asymmetrical, with some asymmetrical internal-loops, also known as bulges. Many important structural motifs are composed of internal loops such as 
the C-loop,
the docking-elbow,
kink-turns (k-turn),
the right-angle,
the sarcin/ricin loops (also called bulged-G motifs),
the twist-up motif
and the UAA/GAN internal loop motif.

References

See also
Stem-loop
Nucleic acid secondary structure

RNA splicing